A Fugitive Economic Offender is a legal term in India. It relates to any individual against whom a warrant for arrest in relation to a "scheduled offence" has been issued by any Indian court under the Fugitive Economic Offenders Act. It applies to individuals who either left India to avoid criminal prosecution; or, being abroad, refuses to return to India to face criminal prosecution. The list of Fugitive Economic Offenders currently residing abroad is Pushpesh Baid, Ashish Jobanputra, Vijay Mallya, Sunny Kalra, Sanjay Kalra, Sudhir Kumar Kalra, Aarti Kalra, Varsha Kalra, Jatin Mehta, Umesh Parekh, Kamlesh Parekh, Nilesh Parekh, Eklavya Garg, Vinay Mittal, Nirav Modi, Neeshal Modi, Mehul Choksi, Sabya Seth, Rajiv Goyal, Alka Goyal, Lalit Modi, Nitin Jayantilal Sandesara, Chetankumar Sandesara, Ritesh Jain, Hitesh Narendrabhai Patel, Mayuriben Patel and Priti Ashish Jobanputra.

History

2018
On 14 March 2018, Minister of State for External Affairs M. J. Akbar stated the names of the 31 absconding businesspeople in the Lok Sabha, including diamond traders Nirav Modi, Mehul Choksi, Jatin Mehta and embattled liquor baron Vijay Mallya, who is facing an investigation from the Central Bureau of Investigation.

Minister of State for External Affairs Gen. (Retd.) V. K. Singh submitted the Fugitive Economic Offender names to the Lok Sabha on 25 July 2018. Singh said: "efforts are being made for securing the presence of these accused in the country by way of issuance of Look out Circular, (Red corner notice) and extradition requests." The CBI and the Enforcement Directorate are pursuing legal actions to bring back 28 Indians (including six women), who have been charged for financial irregularities and criminal offenses, and are believed to have been living abroad since 2015.

2019
On 4 January 2019, Minister of State for Finance Shiv Pratap Shukla said in the Lok Sabha the names of the 27 defaulting businessmen and economic offenders who had fled the country in the last five years. Interpol has been approached and asked to issue red corner notices to 20 of the 27 offenders.

2020
On February 5, 2020, the Minister of State for Finance S.P. Shukla informed the Lok Sabha that a total of 72 Indians charged with frauds or financial irregularities are currently abroad and efforts are being made to bring them back to the country. Only 2 of the fugitives have been brought back to India and they are Vinay Mittal and Sunny Kalra.

List of Fugitive Economic Offender

See also
 Mehul Choksi
 Nirav Modi
 Punjab National Bank Scam

References 

Law of India